Nuno Manuel Soares Gomes (born 21 May 1980 in Lisbon) is a Portuguese former footballer who played as a forward.

He is of Cape Verdean descent.

References

External links

1980 births
Living people
Portuguese sportspeople of Cape Verdean descent
Footballers from Lisbon
Portuguese footballers
Association football forwards
Liga Portugal 2 players
Segunda Divisão players
Casa Pia A.C. players
AD Oeiras players
Real S.C. players
C.D. Fátima players
G.D. Chaves players
Atlético Clube de Portugal players
C.D. Mafra players
União Montemor players
C.D. Pinhalnovense players
C.D. Cova da Piedade players
U.D. Vilafranquense players
Liga II players
FC Progresul București players
C.D. Primeiro de Agosto players
Portuguese expatriate footballers
Expatriate footballers in Romania
Expatriate footballers in Angola
Portuguese expatriate sportspeople in Romania
Portuguese expatriate sportspeople in Angola